This page presents a list of the longest continuous underground rapid transit tunnel sections of the world, excluding branches from the longest tunnel (branch lines that used to transport passengers should be included).

Note: This article only lists tunnels that are 15 km (6.2 miles) or longer.

World's longest subway tunnel sections in use

World's longest subway tunnel sections under construction

See also
 List of longest tunnels
 List of long tunnels by type
 List of longest railway tunnels
 List of long railway tunnels in China

References

Rapid transit
Subway
Subway
Tunnels, subway
Tunnels, subway